Neskuchny is a rural locality (a settlement) in Verkhneikoretskoye Rural Settlement, Bobrovsky District, Voronezh Oblast, Russia. The population was 159 as of 2010.

Geography 
Neskuchny is located 26 km northwest of Bobrov (the district's administrative centre) by road. Nikolskoye 2-ye is the nearest rural locality.

References 

Rural localities in Bobrovsky District